Eddie V's Prime Seafood is an American seafood and steak restaurant chain.

History
The first Eddie V's was opened in Austin, Texas in 2000 by Guy Villavaso and Larry Foles. In 2011, the brand was sold for $59 million cash to Darden Restaurants, Inc. and became a part of Darden's Specialty Restaurant Group.

Locations
As of 2022, there are a total of 29 Eddie V's restaurants.

See also
 List of seafood restaurants

References

External links
 Official website
 Darden Restaurants, Inc. website

Companies based in Orlando, Florida
Restaurants established in 2000
Darden Restaurants brands
Restaurant chains in the United States
Seafood restaurants in the United States
2000 establishments in Texas
American companies established in 2000
2011 mergers and acquisitions